Husqvarna is a Swedish company founded in 1689 to produce muskets. The company has grown since, was partitioned, and is now a brand of multiple companies.

Husqvarna may refer to:

 Husqvarna Vapenfabriks Aktiebolag, the original branch, a defunct firearms manufacturing company
 Husqvarna Group, a manufacturer of outdoor power products
 Husqvarna FF, a football club sponsored by the Husqvarna Group
 Husqvarna Motorcycles, a motocross, enduro and supermoto motorcycle manufacturer
 Husqvarna Sewing Machines, now VSM Group
 Husqvarna, the brand name for home appliances manufactured by Electrolux
 Huskvarna, a city, the original location of the company